The Thomas Curtis House is a historic house at 279 Franklin Street in Quincy, Massachusetts. The 1-3/4 story wood-frame cottage was built around 1851, and is a rare example of mid-18th century eclectic architecture, showing elements of Greek Revival, Italianate, and Gothic Revival styling. The house was built for Thomas Curtis, the owner of one of Quincy's larger shoe and boot manufacturers. He was the son of a local pioneer in the industry, Noah Curtis.

The house was listed on the National Register of Historic Places in 1989.

See also
Noah Curtis House
National Register of Historic Places listings in Quincy, Massachusetts

References

Houses completed in 1851
Houses in Quincy, Massachusetts
National Register of Historic Places in Quincy, Massachusetts
1851 establishments in Massachusetts
Houses on the National Register of Historic Places in Norfolk County, Massachusetts